Jamaal Rolle, also known as "The Celebrity Artist", is a Bahamian visual artist known for his life-like portrait depictions of famous world figures, government officials, entertainment celebrities, and sports stars. Rolle has received wide attention and critical acclaim for his depictions of U.S. President Barack Obama, Prince Harry, Sir Sidney Poitier, Oprah Winfrey, Johnny Depp, and Michael Jackson.

Rolle is a multi-disciplinary artist, working in mediums such as acrylic, oils, charcoal, graphite, colored pencil, pastels, digital media, and cosmetics and has recently embarked on creating artwork using food.

Biography
Jamaal Rolle was born in Nassau, Bahamas, on Thursday, June 7, 1984. He is the 6th child of 13 siblings who are all artistic. His father Harry Rolle, is a Bahamian landscape and caricature artist and bronze sculptor, and his mother Judy Rolle is a conch shell artist. 

Rolle was first inspired to become an artist after a teacher who found a caricature drawing Rolle had made of him in class and purchased it for $10.00.

Rolle's career started in 2001, at Christmas Treasures where Rolle created Junkanoo inspired Christmas ornaments under the supervision of the late Paul Knowles. Rolle later transitioned to drawing live portraits and caricatures at the Marina Village, Atlantis, Paradise Island, Bahamas. Paradise Island.

Rolle is the artist and author behind the popular Socio-political news column, “Pushin Da Envelope", featured on weekdays in the Tribune Newspaper of The Bahamas.

2009 U.S. Presidential Election
Rolle was inspired by then presidential nominee Barack Obama and started the "Bahama for Obama" campaign, which used the phrase "I Am the Dream" (an allusion to Martin Luther King Jr.'s 1963 "I Have a Dream" speech) during the 2008 U.S. Presidential Election. Obama also "inspired him to do an oil portrait on Super Tuesday. He displays this portrait at his studio in downtown Nassau and it has received heavy attention from the thousands of American tourist that pass by on a daily basis." During President Barack Obama's 2009 Inauguration, Rolle presented a portrait to Reverend Al Sharpton at the Martin Luther King Jr. Day Rally in Washington D.C. The portrait depicts side by side portraits of Obama, Sharpton, and King.

References

American artists